Vianania argentinensis is a moth of the family Erebidae first described by Rothschild in 1912. It is found in Argentina.

References

Lithosiini